Thomas Moore House may refer to:

Thomas Moore House (Indianapolis, Indiana), listed on the National Register of Historic Places in Marion County, Indiana
Thomas Moore House (Poplar Bluff, Missouri), listed on the National Register of Historic Places in Butler County, Missouri
Thomas Moore House (Franklin, Tennessee), listed on the National Register of Historic Places in Williamson County, Tennessee

See also
Moore House (disambiguation)